The Civic Platform (GP) is a conservative-liberal political organization in Serbia. 

It was formed in 2017, by former members of the Enough is Enough (DJB) organization. It had two MPs from its foundation until the 2020 parliamentary election, which it boycotted. It was the founding member of the Alliance for Serbia, and is currently taking part in the United Serbia for the 2022 general election.

History
The Civic Platform was founded in April 2017 by assembly members Aleksandra Čabraja, Sonja Pavlović and Jovan Jovanović, all of whom had been elected in the 2016 Serbian parliamentary election on the DJB electoral list. In announcing its formation, Jovanović indicated that the Civic Platform was also supported by citizens and by thirteen councillors in central Belgrade.

The Civic Platform supported Saša Janković's bid for the Serbian presidency in the 2017 Serbian presidential election. In May 2017, the three members of this group joined with two parliamentarians from the New Party to start a new parliamentary caucus known as the Independent MPs Club.

Čabraja was excluded from the Independent MPs Club on 25 March 2019 and subsequently charged that the club had become a de facto extension of the Alliance for Serbia coalition. Jovanović rejected this charge.

Along with several other opposition parties, the Civic Platform boycotted the 2020 Serbian parliamentary election. It is a part of the United Serbia coalition and will participate in the 2022 general election.

Electoral performance

Parliamentary election

Presidential elections

References

2017 establishments in Serbia
Political parties established in 2017
Conservative liberal parties
Liberal parties in Serbia
Enough is Enough (party) breakaway groups